This page lists the World Best Year Performance in the year 1997 in the men's decathlon. One of the main events during this season were the 1997 World Championships in Athens, Greece, where the competition started on August 5, 1997, and ended on August 6, 1997.

Records

1997 World Year Ranking

See also
1997 Hypo-Meeting

References
decathlon2000
apulanta
digilander

1997
Decathlon Year Ranking, 1997